Miroslav Kráľ (born 2 November 1947) is a Slovak footballer. He competed in the men's tournament at the 1968 Summer Olympics.

References

External links
 

1947 births
Living people
Slovak footballers
Czechoslovak footballers
Olympic footballers of Czechoslovakia
Footballers at the 1968 Summer Olympics
Sportspeople from Topoľčany
Association football forwards
MŠK Žilina players